Baron  was a Japanese naval physician.

Early life
Born in Hyūga Province (present-day Miyazaki Prefecture) as the son of a samurai retainer to the Satsuma domain, Takaki studied Chinese medicine as a youth and served as a medic in the Boshin War. He later studied western medical science under British doctor William Willis (in Japan 1861–1881). Takaki entered the Imperial Japanese Navy as a medical officer in 1872. He was sent to Great Britain for medical studies in 1875, and interned at St Thomas's Hospital Medical School now part of King's College London in London. He returned to Japan in 1880.

Work on beriberi
At the time, beriberi (considered endemic to Japan) was a serious problem on warships and was affecting naval efficiency. Takaki knew that beriberi was not common among Western navies. He also noticed that Japanese naval officers, whose diet consisted of various types of vegetables and meat, rarely suffered from beriberi. On the other hand, the disease was common among ordinary crewmen, whose diet consisted almost exclusively of white rice (which was supplied free, whereas other foods had to be purchased). Many crewmen from poor families, who had to send money back home, often tried to save money by eating nothing but rice.

In 1883 Takaki learned of a very high incidence of beriberi among cadets on a training mission from Japan to Hawaii, via New Zealand and South America that lasted for 9 months. On board, 169 men out of 376 developed the disease and 25 died. Takaki made a petition to Emperor Meiji to fund an experiment with an improved diet for the seamen that included more barley, meat, milk, bread and vegetables. He succeeded, and in 1884, another mission took the same route, but this time only sixteen beriberi cases among 333 seamen were reported. This experiment convinced the Imperial Japanese Navy that poor diet was the prime factor in beriberi, and the disease was soon eliminated from the fleet. Takaki's success occurred ten years before Christiaan Eijkman, working in Batavia, advanced his theory that beriberi was caused by a nutritional deficiency, with his later identification of vitamin B1 earning him the 1929 Nobel Prize in Physiology or Medicine.

Although Takaki clearly established that the cause was due to nutritional issues, this conflicted with the prevailing idea among medical scientists that beriberi was an infectious disease. The Imperial Japanese Army, which was dominated by doctors from Tokyo Imperial University, persisted in their belief that beriberi was an infectious disease, and refused to implement a remedy for decades. In the Russo-Japanese War of 1904–1905, over 200,000 soldiers suffered from beriberi – 27,000 fatally, compared to 47,000 deaths from combat.

In 1905, Takaki was ennobled with the title of danshaku (baron) under the kazoku peerage system for his contribution of eliminating beriberi from the Imperial Japanese Navy, and also awarded the Order of the Rising Sun (first class). He was later affectionately nicknamed "Barley Baron".

Takaki founded the Sei-I-Kwai medical society in January 1881. In May, 1881, he founded the Sei-I-Kwai Koshujo (Sei-I-Kwai Medical Training School), now the Jikei University School of Medicine. Takaki's school was the first private medical college in Japan, and was the first in Japan to have students dissect human cadavers.

Takaki was posthumously honored by having a peninsula in Antarctica at  named "Takaki Promontory" in his honor. It is the only peninsula in Antarctica named after a Japanese person.

References 

 Bay, Alexander. "Beriberi in Modern Japan: The Making of a National Disease". University of Rochester Press (2012). .
 Low, Morris. Building a Modern Japan: Science, Technology, and Medicine in the Meiji Era and Beyond. Palgrave Macmillan (2005). .
 Matsuda, Makoto. Kakke o nakushita otoko Takaki Kanehiro den. Kodansha (1990). .
 Kenneth J. Carpenter. Beriberi, White Rice and Vitamin B. University of California Press.

External links
Jikei University School of Medicine: Our Roots - To Serve the Suffering Poor.

1849 births
1920 deaths
Japanese military doctors
Japanese scientists
People of the Boshin War
People from Miyazaki Prefecture
Kazoku
People of Meiji-period Japan
Alumni of St Thomas's Hospital Medical School
University and college founders